The Doassansiales are an order of fungi in the class Exobasidiomycetes. The order consist of three families: the Doassansiaceae, the Melaniellaceae, and the Rhamphosporaceae (which is a monotypic family with a monotypic genus, with one species; Rhamphospora nymphaeae ).

References

Ustilaginomycotina
Basidiomycota orders
Taxa named by Franz Oberwinkler